Choke may refer to:

Entertainment

Albums and songs
 Choke (album), a 1990 album by The Beautiful South
 Choke (Kiss It Goodbye EP), a 1999 EP by Kiss It Goodbye
 Choke, a 2019 EP by Poppy
 "Choke" (Sepultura song), 1998
 Choke (I Dont Know How But They Found Me song), 2017
"Choke", a 2021 song by The Warning
 "Choke", a song on the album The Devil Put Dinosaurs Here by Alice in Chains
 "Choke", a song on the album Sorry for Partyin' by Bowling for Soup
 "Choke", a 2001 song on the album Echo Park by Feeder
 "Choke", a song on the album Aneurythm by Living Syndication

Film and television
 Choke (2008 film), a film based on the novel by Chuck Palahniuk
Choke (2011 film), a Canadian animated short film
 Choke (1999 film), a documentary about Rickson Gracie's preparation for the 1995 Vale Tudo Fighting Championship
 Choke (2001 film), a psychological thriller directed by John M. Sjogren
 Choked (film), a 2020 Indian drama film
 "Choke" (Glee), an episode of Glee

Other entertainment
 Choke (band), a Canadian band
 Choke (music collective), a musical group in Bristol, England
 Choke (novel), a 2001 novel by Chuck Palahniuk
 Choke, a 1995 novel by Stuart Woods

Other uses
 Choke (electronics), an inductor used to block signals of particular frequencies
An inductor of any type, sometimes referred to as a choke
 Choke (firearms), a tapered constriction of a shotgun barrel's bore at the muzzle end
 Choke (horse), a condition in horses in which the esophagus is blocked
 Choke (sports), a failure to win games at a crucial moment
 Choking, obstruction of airflow into the lungs
 Chokehold, a grappling hold on the neck
 Choked flow, a restriction of fluid flow under pressure, in which the fluid reaches sonic flow
 Choke point, a constriction in a conduit or transport system, e.g. a narrowing of a road
 Choke valve, a valve used to control the fuel-air mixture in internal combustion engines
 Chokecherry, a suckering shrub or small tree, a species of bird cherry
 Choke Yasuoka (born 1973), wheelchair racer

See also
 Chowk (disambiguation) (pronounced "choke"), in Hindi-Urdu, is a place where paths intersect
 Artichoke (or 'chokes), vegetable using the flower head
 Sunchoke, vegetable using the tuber